Mookgo Maria Matuba is a South African politician for the African National Congress who is serving as a Member of the National Assembly of South Africa, as of 17 August 2022. She replaced Constance Seoposengwe who resigned to take up the position of South African High Commissioner to Lesotho.

Since becoming an MP, Matuba has been a member of the Standing Committee on Auditor-General and the Portfolio Committee on Water and Sanitation.

References

External links
Profile at Parliament of South Africa

Living people
Year of birth missing (living people)
African National Congress politicians
Members of the National Assembly of South Africa
Women members of the National Assembly of South Africa